Glenburn is a large suburb situated to the south of Paisley, close to the Gleniffer Braes. Glenburn has three primary schools (Bushes Primary, Langcraigs Primary and St. Peter's Primary). A public library and many shops can be found at Skye Crescent. Other shops can be found in Glenburn on Braehead Road and Glenburn Road. Glenburn is also close to Foxbar, another suburb in Paisley.

A new agreement has been launched to help take forward the regeneration of Glenburn in Paisley. The Glenburn Estate Management Agreement brings together the community and a number of organisations to work together so that the area continues to improve for the benefit of the community. 

Organisations involved in housing, regeneration, planning and environmental issues have pledged to deliver services to agreed standards. And the organisations involved have pledged that promoting community involvement developing services is "a priority."

Councillor Brian Lawson, Renfrewshire Council's previous housing spokesperson, welcomed the new agreement, saying: "The development of this agreement is a positive step for Glenburn. It's important that the council and other organisations working in the area have worked together to deliver agreed levels of service. It is equally important that the community of Glenburn plays its part in helping the agreement work properly for the benefit of everyone living in the area."

Shirley MacLean of Glenburn Community Forum and the local tenants' and residents' association said: "A lot of hard work, time and effort has gone into the production of this agreement. The estate management agreement will prove to be an invaluable tool for the people of Glenburn as it is full of relevant and very useful information together with contact details in one easy to read document. I'm sure that the benefits of the agreement will speak for themselves."

Among the services and issues which are covered in the estate management agreement are: housing; land maintenance; street cleaning; community policing; roads and pavements; utility services; and ways of enabling the community to have a greater responsibility for the local environment. Glenburn is the latest community in Renfrewshire to benefit from an estate management agreement following on from Ferguslie, Moorpark, Foxbar and West Johnstone.

Areas in Paisley, Renfrewshire
Housing estates in Scotland